Hasan Jamil Alvi (25 July 1952 – 7 October 2015) was a Pakistani cricketer who played six ODIs between 1977 and 1978. He was an all-rounder, batting and bowling left-handed.

References 

 

1952 births
Cricketers from Karachi
Pakistan One Day International cricketers
Pakistani cricketers
Kalat cricketers
Karachi Greens cricketers
Karachi Blues cricketers
Pakistan Universities cricketers
Karachi Whites cricketers
Pakistan International Airlines cricketers
Pakistan International Airlines A cricketers
Sindh cricketers
Habib Bank Limited cricketers
2015 deaths